William Gibbins (1872–1956) is a former Chairman of Everton. He presided over the club between 1940 and 1947, and was on the Board from 1920 to 1953. He was also actively involved with the Liverpool County Football Association. He died at his home in Bootle on 22 September 1956.

He is credited with introducing baseball to Goodison Park.

References

1872 births
1956 deaths
English football chairmen and investors
Everton F.C. directors and chairmen
People from Bootle